East Side/West Side is an American drama series starring George C. Scott, Elizabeth Wilson, Cicely Tyson, and, later on, Linden Chiles. The series aired for one season (1963–1964), and was shown Monday nights on CBS.

Set in New York City, the show explored issues of urban life, some of them grim. Though it won critical praise, it also generated some controversy. TV Guide ranked it #6 on their 2013 list of 60 shows that were "Cancelled Too Soon".

Synopsis
The series centers on Scott in the role of Neil Brock, a New York City social worker who worked for the private agency Community Welfare Service, with his secretary, Jane Foster, played by actress Cicely Tyson (this was the first time an African American starred in a television drama). Episodes of East Side/West Side covered topics relevant to the inner city, with many controversial issues explored. A typical example came in the first two episodes, when Brock investigated a prostitute and her child ("The Sinner"), followed by a story involving statutory rape (“Age of Consent”).

In an effort to open up the number of possible stories, Brock resigned from his job in the latter portion of the 1963–64 season to work for a New York congressman, Charles W. Hanson (Chiles). The characters played by Elizabeth Wilson and Cicely Tyson soon disappeared and Barbara Feldon is introduced as Brock's girlfriend for one episode.

Despite the high quality of both the writing and acting, the show's penchant for taking on touchy topics forced many potential advertisers to avoid sponsorship of the show, while a number of local stations across the country also chose not to present the program to their viewers. It is said that CBS programming head James Aubrey clashed with Scott regarding the direction of the show, which also was a factor in the cancellation.

The December 23, 1963 episode, "Creeps Live Here," was originally scheduled to be broadcast on November 25, but was postponed as CBS wrapped up their four-day coverage of the John F. Kennedy assassination.

East Side/West Side ran in the 10 p.m. Monday time slot opposite ABC's medical drama about psychiatry, Breaking Point and NBC's Sing Along with Mitch starring Mitch Miller. The show's executive producer, David Susskind, began a letter-writing campaign to government officials, newspaper editors and other prominent individuals. Susskind's request was an attempt to elicit positive feedback to encourage renewal of the series. However, the effort failed when the show was cancelled on January 28.

Cast
 George C. Scott as Neil Brock
 Linden Chiles as Congressman Charles Hanson (Episodes 19–26)
 John McMartin as Mike Miller (Episodes 19–26)
 Cicely Tyson as Jane Foster (Episodes 1–22)
 Elizabeth Wilson as Frieda Hechlinger (Episodes 1–22)

Conception and development
East Side/West Side started as a vehicle for George C. Scott, who had recently came to prominence after acclaimed theatrical performances and a series of important films. On January 3, 1962, CBS and United Artists announced that they were beginning preparations for an hour-long drama starring Scott, to be launched during the 1963-1964 season.

Scott did not like the idea of the show being prepared for him, and threatened to abrogate his agreement with CBS. James Aubrey, the president of CBS at that time, introduced Scott to an independent producer David Susskind. Susskind turned to his friend Robert Alan Aurthur, a talented television playwright, who offered an unproduced script of his, My Three Angels, centered around a trio of inner-city social workers. Aurthur rewrote the script to fit Scott and renamed the project East Side/West Side, a reference to the two halves of upper Manhattan as bisected by Central Park. The main protagonist was Neil Brock, played by Scott — a tough, impatient, temperamental case worker. With the approval of Aubrey and his newest television star, David Susskind began production on Aurthur’s pilot script, a story about a teen gang killer and his path through the legal system, now called It’s War, Man.

The central location of the series was the Community Welfare Service (CWS), a private agency that served as home base for three social workers dedicated to solving the everyday problems, major and minor, of the denizens of an impoverished Manhattan neighborhood. According to George C. Scott, the setting was chosen deliberately to get his character out of the office and maximize the audience’s exposure to the real streets of New York.

In November 1962, Susskind attended the New York City Social Work Recruiting Committee and announced his plans to create a television series built around the social work profession. He and his staff were provided with appropriate literature and were engaged in discussion of story ideas and scripts. In January 1963, Bertram Beck, Associate Executive Director of National Association of Social Workers (NASW), informed chairs of his organization of Susskind's interest in producing a show about social workers and requested that they send story ideas to the producer. Beck carried the responsibility of consultant and technical adviser for the series, he read scripts, made editorial comments and changes, and handled much of the mail from social workers who wrote to NASW about the series.

"It's War, Man" resembled an episode of a courtroom procedural The Defenders and gave little indication of the shocking, socially-conscious show that East Side / West Side would become.

Social context
During the 1950s, the Eisenhower Administration accepted the doctrine that "economic growth would itself, by diffusing prosperity, reduce inequalities and resolve social problems. The progressive tax structure, expanded welfare services, mass public education, and the G.I. Bill all served the twin aims of economic growth and income redistribution". However, by the mid-fifties, it became clear that economic growth alone "was not distributing its benefits as expected".

In 1962, Michael Harrington, in The Other America, exposed the misery and deprivation of a "new" poor. This group, left out of the nation's economic growth and represented by the sick, disabled, old, minorities of color, and members of female-headed families, had not benefited from post-World War prosperity. In January 1963, Dwight Macdonald provided an exhaustive summary of previous studies on poverty in an important article titled "Our Invisible Poor" in The New Yorker magazine. He stated that mass poverty persisted, and that it was one of two grave social problems, the other being the relationship of poverty to race. He concluded that the federal government was the only force that could reduce poverty and make the lives of the poor more bearable. Between 1961 and 1964, grants were provided to combat the problems of the "new poor" through improving educational facilities, youth programs, and, in general, improving their physical and social well-being.

John F. Kennedy's 1960 presidential campaign heightened the public's consciousness of poverty. Once elected, he established the President's Committee on Juvenile Delinquency and Youth Crime, which sponsored employment programs, manpower training, remedial education, anti-discrimination activities, and neighborhood service centers in several cities. The Area Redevelopment Act, passed in 1961, provided federal dollars to improve public facilities, and to provide technical assistance and retraining. In 1962, Congress enacted the Manpower Development and Training Act. The reform efforts of the late 1950s and early 1960s culminated in the War on Poverty, initiated by the Administration of Lyndon B. Johnson.

An episode on an African-American couple in Harlem was "blacked out" by CBS affiliates in Shreveport, Louisiana, and Atlanta, Georgia.

Episodes

Awards and nominations
In 1964, the series received eight Emmy Award nominations, including one win for Outstanding Directorial Achievement awarded to Tom Gries for the controversial November 4, 1963, episode entitled, "Who Do You Kill?". The episode, which also garnered a writing nomination, as well as acting nominations for supporting actors James Earl Jones and Diana Sands, explored the aftermath of a child's death from a rat bite in a Harlem slum.

References

External links
 
 

1963 American television series debuts
1964 American television series endings
1960s American drama television series
Black-and-white American television shows
CBS original programming
English-language television shows
Television series by United Artists Television
Television shows filmed in New York (state)
Television shows set in New York City